New Copse is a hamlet in the large civil parish of Bentworth in Hampshire, England. The hamlet is often confused with neighbouring Holt End, which also lies in Bentworth.

Until 1932 it was the Bentworth and Lasham railway station on the Basingstoke and Alton Light Railway, until its closure.

References

Hamlets in Hampshire